Black, Hawthorn and Company was a steam locomotive manufacturer  with a works situated in Gateshead, Tyne and Wear, UK.

John Coulthard and Son
The Quarry Field Works was opened in 1835 by John and Ralph Coulthard, known as John Coulthard and Son which became R. Coulthard and Company in 1853 when the partnership was dissolved. There followed more of the same and several  engines. Although the works numbers went up to 100, probably only twenty were new, since the company carried out a great deal of rebuilding work.

Black, Hawthorn & Co
In 1865 Ralph Coulthard retired and the works was taken over by William Black and Thomas Hawthorn, who concentrated on industrial tank locomotives, both four and six coupled.  The company supplied steam locomotives to collieries and works, particularly in North East England.  They also built a number of crane engines.  Some of the locomotives were very long-lived. A  steam locomotive is preserved and is currently getting a refit at the Tanfield Railway.

Chapman and Furneaux
By 1896 over a thousand engines had been built when the firm was taken over by Chapman and Furneaux,  A further seventy were produced before closing in 1902, with drawings, patterns and goodwill being bought by R & W Hawthorn and Leslie of Newcastle.

Preservation

Preserved Black, Hawthorn locomotives include:

 Wellington,  at Tanfield Railway, works no.266, built 1873
 Bauxite No.2,  at NRM York, works no.305, built 1874
 Kettering Furnaces No.3,  built for the Kettering Ironstone Railway, preserved at Penrhyn Castle Railway Museum works no.859, built 1885
 E No.1,  at Beamish Museum, works no.897, built 1887
 City of Aberdeen,  at Bo'ness & Kenneil railway, owned by SRPS , works no.912, built 1887

References

 Lowe, J.W., (1989) British Steam Locomotive Builders, Guild Publishing

Locomotive manufacturers of the United Kingdom